The year 535 BC was a year of the pre-Julian Roman calendar. In the Roman Empire, it was known as year 219  Ab urbe condita. The denomination 535 BC for this year has been used since the early medieval period, when the Anno Domini calendar era became the prevalent method in Europe for naming years.

Events

By place

Europe 
 Phocaean Greek colonists clash with Carthaginian and Etruscan ships in the Battle of Alalia (near Corsica).

Asia 
 The Sungai Batu Civilization in Malaysia begins.

Births 
 Heraclitus, Greek philosopher (approximate date) (d. c. 475 BC)

Deaths

References